HIT: The Second Case is a 2022 Indian Telugu-language crime thriller film written and directed by Sailesh Kolanu. It is the second installment in the HITverse following HIT: The First Case (2020). The film stars Adivi Sesh, Meenakshi Chaudhary and Rao Ramesh. The plot follows Krishna Dev (Sesh) solving a serial murder case in Visakhapatnam. 

HIT: The Second Case was released on 2 December 2022 and received positive reviews from critics, where it became a commercial success at the box office.

Plot 
Ram Prasad Koduri perceives his wife Jhansi's extra-marital affair and feels broken. Fearing that he would expose her, Jhansi has Ram Prasad arrested on false marital rape charges, tarnishing his reputation. Though he returns home, he is socially boycotted, and later commits suicide.

Krishna Dev, shortly known as KD is a SP in the Homicidal Intervention Team (HIT) of Andhra Pradesh in Vishakapatnam, who is accomplished for his presence of mind and quickness in nabbing criminals. He is engaged in a live-in relationship with Aarya, an entrepreneur and active member of an association for women's welfare. A woman employed in a bar, Sanjana is brutally murdered and butchered at her workplace after everyone leaves. Assigned on the case, KD learns from the forensic department that, of the body parts they found at the crime spot apparently of Sanjana, only the head is hers and the other body parts are of three other women. Through a bite mark on Sanjana's neck, it is discovered that the murderer has an extra tooth on his incisors.

Along with his teammates, Abhilash and Varsha, KD meets Sanjana's roommate Rajitha, who informs them of a pub, Sanjana frequented. KD and his team interrogate the staff but to no avail. KD meets Sanjana's parents and through one of her photos with her childhood friends, he realizes that Sanjana had a friend Raghavudu, with an extra tooth on his incisors like that of the murderer. Realizing that he is employed in Vishakapatnam, KD suspects him of murdering Sanjana and goes to his residence in Vizag, finding the shoes that exactly match with the shoe prints found at the crime scene. Raghavudu claims that he did not murder Sanjana but refuses to divulge where he was when the murder took place. Abhilash learns that the assassination attempt on Vikram Rudraraju was ordered by Vikram's superior Vishwanath, who is now dead.

Meanwhile, Aarya tells KD that she is pregnant with his child. Court trials begin against Raghavudu and due to political pressure as the brutality of murder earns great criticism from the public and media, KD's superior DGP Nageshwar Rao orders an encounter to be operated. KD receives a mail and is notified that Raghuvudu was at Kakinada when Sanjana was killed. He contacts Nageshwar Rao to request him to stop Raghavudu's encounter but Nageshwar Rao refuses to oblige, frightened of the criticism that the police department would receive if everyone comes to know that they have caught the wrong person. To rescue Raghuvudu, KD informs a journalist of this, seeking help, and sends him a video proving Raghavudu's presence in Kakinada during the murder.

The encounter is stopped, but Raghavudu commits suicide in prison due to disgrace. Varsha informs KD that Raghavudu was with his lover, who is married, in Kakinada during the murder, and to protect her from being humiliated for meeting him, he refused to disclose where he was. KD receives threats from the murderer, whose next targets are Rajitha and Aarya, where he provides personal security for Aarya without revealing the truth to her while asking Rajitha to move in with her boyfriend Kumar. KD realizes that the pubs allow customers with an invisible mark that can be made visible with laser on their hand as an entry pass and finds that a similar mark was found on the hand, they found with Sanjana's head. KD traces the girl, Tanya, who went missing, a few months ago. Aarya informs KD that Tanya was also an active member of the women's welfare association.

KD learns that the other body part belongs to Pooja, former president of the same women's welfare association whose corpse was found in Hyderabad by Vikram Rudraraju. KD learns from an aged housekeeper that many years ago, the president of the same association, Jhansi was also brutally murdered. KD and Varsha reach Jhansi's residence and finds that Jhansi and Ramprasad had a son. Later an unknown person sets the house on fire and tries to kill KD but he survives. Later, the murderer abducts Aarya. KD and Varsha find that all the victims frequented a dental clinic owned by Rajeev Kumar Koduri, Ramprasad's son who was depressed as his father committed suicide out of disgrace while his mother had no regret. He targets women from the women's association, his mother worked as its president, and judges all women in those associations as ill-intended and wants to kill them.

KD reaches the clinic and realizes that Rajeev is none other than Rajitha's boyfriend Kumar, who captures KD and threatens to kill Aarya. In one of his earlier cases, KD judged the criminals as dumb which made Kumar annoyed, and he decided to challenge KD but he had taken it personally when KD made him burn the hous his father had built. KD's pet Max attacks and mauls Kumar while KD unties himself and defeats Kumar with Varsha's assistance, injuring him badly. After a few days, KD files for a transfer to the Homicide Intervention Team (HIT) in Telangana  and marries Aarya. Arjun Sarkaar, KD's replacement, arrives to congratulate the couple.

Cast

Production
After the success of HIT: The First Case, Nani announced a sequel in February 2021, one year after the film's release. Sailesh Kolanu who directed the first film of the franchise would be directing this. Adivi Sesh has replaced Vishwak Sen in the sequel. Nani wanted the franchise to be "concept oriented" rather than "star oriented," so he moved the setting from Telangana to Andhra Pradesh and chose Sesh as the protagonist. Meenakshi Chaudhary was cast opposite Sesh. Sen said he missed out on the sequel due to scheduling conflicts, and wished he'd be part of HIT 3 or 4. The film was then formally launched in March 2021 with a pooja ceremony. Principal photography commenced in August 2021 in Visakhapatnam. In December 2021, Nani confirmed that 90% of the shoot is completed with filming also taking place in Hyderabad. In July 2022, it was announced that the final schedule would commence in August 2022.

Music
The music of the film is composed by M. M. Srilekha and Suresh Bobbili. The film score is composed by John Stewart Eduri.

Release
HIT: The Second Case was released theatrically on 2 December 2022. Earlier, the film was scheduled to release on 29 July 2022. However, Sesh announced that the film was postponed due to the promotional works of his film Major (2022) and the film having production delays. On November 25, The film has received an 'A' certificate because of its gruesome nature and use of profanity.

The theatrical rights of the film were sold at a cost of ₹14.5 crore. A Hindi dubbed version was released theatrically on 30 December 2022. The film was premiered on Amazon Prime Video on 6 January 2023.

Reception 
HIT: The Second Case received positive reviews from the critics.

Balakrishna Ganeshan of The News Minute rated the film 3.5 out of 5 stars and wrote "Sailesh Kolanu’s HIT 2 is one of the best-written Telugu films in recent times, with each character, scene, and dialogue having relevance to the story". Arvind V of Pinkvilla rated the film 3 out of 5 stars and wrote "The thriller, executed with aplomb by Sailesh Kolanu, wants to be a consummate whodunit, in the sense that it shifts its focus away from who committed the crime to what are the killer's motives for committing it". Manoj Kumar R of The Indian Express rated the film 2.5 out of 5 stars and wrote "HIT 2 is a significant improvement over the first iteration. One can only hope that Sailesh fills in the gaps in his storytelling and becomes a more refined filmmaker with HIT 3". Neeshita Nyayapati of The Times of India rated the film 2.5 out of 5 stars and wrote "The film delivers what it promises when it comes to the gore and taking the HIT universe forward". Rotkim Rajpal of India Today rated the film 2.5 out of 5 stars and wrote "HIT 2 is a middling thriller that caters only to Advi Sesh but doesn’t do justice to its inherently engaging story". Sakshi Post rated the film 2.5 out of 5 stars and termed the film as a "gripping thriller" and wrote, If you are a fan of crime thrillers, you would surely love this. Watch it for Adivi Sesh.

References

External links

2022 films
Films set in Andhra Pradesh
Films shot in Hyderabad, India
Films shot in Visakhapatnam
Indian action thriller films
Indian sequel films
Indian slasher films
2020s Telugu-language films
Fictional portrayals of the Andhra Pradesh Police
Films about missing people
2022 crime thriller films
Indian serial killer films
Films directed by Sailesh Kolanu
Indian films about revenge